Les Amis is a fine-dining restaurant in Singapore serving French cuisine. The restaurant was opened in 1994 as the flagship of the Les Amis Group. Sebastien Lepinoy is the current chef de cuisine and Cheryl Koh is the current pastry chef.

Cuisine  
In 2013, Chef Sebastien Lepinoy joined Les Amis. He brought with him a collection of recipes which feature seasonal ingredients sourced from all over France.

Wines 
Les Amis has built a reputation for its wine cellar which has more than 3000 bottles. Most of the wines are French, mainly Burgundy and Bordeaux.

Accolades 
Over the years, Les Amis has won several awards. It was featured as one of the best restaurants in Singapore in The Daily Telegraph in 2016. It was the recipient of the World Gourmet Summit's Wine List of the Year award in 2001, 2002, 2003 and 2004, and was inducted into the Awards Of Excellence Hall of Fame in 2009. It was also the recipient of the World Gourmet Summit's Old World Wine List of the Year award in 2009, 2010 and 2013, and was inducted into the Awards Of Excellence Hall of Fame in 2014.

Restaurant magazine placed Les Amis within the top 20 best restaurants in Asia in their annual list of the Top 50 Restaurants in Asia in their inaugural 2013 edition. It has also been placed in their top 20 best restaurants in 2014, 2015 and 2016. Pastry chef Cheryl Koh was named Asia's Best Pastry Chef by the magazine in 2016.

The restaurant received two stars in the Michelin Guide's inaugural 2016 Singapore edition. In September 2019, Les Amis received a third Michelin star, along with another Singaporean fine-dining French restaurant, Odette.

See also 
 List of Michelin starred restaurants in Singapore
 List of restaurants in Singapore

References 

Michelin Guide starred restaurants in Singapore
French restaurants in Singapore